Tetsuo: The Bullet Man is a 2009 Japanese cyberpunk horror film. It was preceded by Tetsuo: The Iron Man and Tetsuo II: Body Hammer.

Plot
Anthony is a man with an American father and a deceased Japanese mother living and working in Tokyo. One day, his son is killed in a car accident and shortly afterward, Anthony begins to transform into metal. Receiving a vision of scientific documents, Anthony uncovers a secret room in his father's house which contains files detailing a mysterious Tetsuo Project. He also learns that his father met his mother while they each researched the project. Anthony's wife Yuriko arrives but before she sees her transformed husband, a S.W.A.T. team arrives and she is taken hostage. Anthony's transformation finishes its hold and he defeats the S.W.A.T. team with bullets fired from his body, but refrains from killing them. The severely injured team is extracted, but then killed by Yatsu, this film's version of "The Metal Fetishist".

Now believing that he has been possessed by a demon, Anthony attempts to kill himself using a gun growing from his hand but this fails. Anthony and Yuriko then meet up with Anthony's father, who explains everything: Anthony's mother was disgusted with the militaristic outcome of the Tetsuo Project, having joined it as a way to help give crippled and sick people new bodies. When Anthony's mother realized that she would soon die from cancer, she insisted that her husband recreate her as a Tetsuo android so that he may still have a child with his recreated wife. That child became Anthony, which means that Anthony and his late son were always part Tetsuo. Meanwhile, it is revealed that Yatsu was the one that killed Anthony's son via vehicular homicide, as a way to provoke Anthony's transformation. Yatsu, in this version without metal powers, has come to the conclusion that the only way he would prefer to die is by a bullet from Anthony's body as committing murder would push Anthony to consume and destroy the world in Yatsu's stead. Yatsu kidnaps Yuriko and threatens to detonate a bomb he has fashioned into her necklace if Anthony does not shoot him. Anthony's rage transformation reaches its pinnacle and he becomes a gigantic metal beast with a cannon in its center. Yatsu provokes and threatens Anthony to shoot him. Receiving a vision of the city exploding in a giant ball of light if he does kill Yatsu, Anthony denies this wish and instead consumes Yatsu whole into his metal body, then returns to his human form.

Five years later, Anthony and Yuriko have had a new child and have returned to a normal, contented life. As he stands before a mirror, Anthony hears Yatsu's final words: "[You don't want me inside you.] You don't know what I'll do". However, when a group of young thugs attempt to intimidate Anthony while walking down the street, rather than allow his anger to overtake him, he walks calmly and confidently past them.

Cast
 Eric Bossick as Anthony
 Shinya Tsukamoto as Yatsu
 Akiko Monō as Yuriko
 Stephen Sarrazin as Ride

Release

The film premiered on 5 September 2009 as part of the Venice Film Festival and premiered in the US on April 25, 2010 as part of the Tribeca Film Festival.

Soundtrack
The closing credits of the film feature an original track by Trent Reznor of industrial rock band Nine Inch Nails entitled "Theme for Tetsuo: The Bullet Man". Director Shinya Tsukamoto has stated that the collaboration with band leader Trent Reznor marked the fulfillment of a long-held ambition to work with the group. Tsukamoto had previously collaborated with Reznor on a Tetsuo-esque commercial for MTV Japan.

Merchandise
Kotobukiya released the official Bullet Man Real Figure on the 2010 San Diego Comic-Con International.

References

External links
 

2009 science fiction action films
2009 horror films
Japanese action horror films
Biopunk films
Body horror films
Japanese horror films
Japanese science fiction films
English-language Japanese films
Films directed by Shinya Tsukamoto
Films scored by Chu Ishikawa
Japanese sequel films
Japanese science fiction action films
2000s science fiction horror films
Fictional cyborgs
Fictional human hybrids
2009 films
Japanese science fiction horror films
2000s Japanese films
Cyberpunk films